Barbara Berlusconi (born 30 July 1984) is an Italian business executive. She is advisor to the board of Fininvest and previously sat on the board of directors of A.C. Milan as vice-chairman and CEO.

Early life
Barbara Berlusconi was born in Arlesheim, Basel-Landschaft canton, Switzerland in the summer of 1984, and is the daughter of Silvio Berlusconi and Veronica Lario (who became his second wife, in 1990). Barbara Berlusconi's godfather was Bettino Craxi. She made her formal debut in Paris at the Bal des débutantes in 2001. She has two older half-siblings, Maria Elvira "Marina" (born in 1966) and Pier Silvio (born in 1969), from her father's first marriage. She also has two younger siblings, Eleonora (born in 1986) and Luigi (born in 1988).

Education
Berlusconi completed her primary education at the Steiner school of Milan, in Città Studi. Berlusconi then attended secondary school at Collegio Villoresi San Giuseppe of Monza in Italy, and in July 2010, At 26 years old, Berlusconi obtained her bachelor in Philosophy, and gained a first class degree, with 110/110 cum laude, at the Vita-Salute San Raffaele University, founded and run by Don Verzé until 2011.

Fininvest SpA
Since September 2003, Berlusconi has been member of the board of directors of Fininvest SpA.

A.C. Milan
In April 2011, Berlusconi was given a role on the board of directors at A.C. Milan and since 30 November 2013 one of the CEO of the club.

Personal life

Family
She has two sons, Alessandro (born in 2007) and Edoardo (born in 2009), with former partner Giorgio Valaguzza. Berlusconi resides in Switzerland. She was previously in a relationship with Alexandre Pato from 2011 to 2013. She has two other sons, Leone (born in 2016) and Francesco Amos (born in 2018), with her current partner Lorenzo Guerrieri.

See also

Adriano Galliani
Marina Berlusconi

Notes and references

External links
Barbara Berlusconi – profile at Fininvest SpA

Swiss mass media people
People from Basel-Landschaft
Children of national leaders
Berlusconi family
Living people
1984 births
Debutantes of le Bal des débutantes
Italian chief executives
Swiss Roman Catholics
Swiss people of Italian descent
21st-century Italian businesswomen
21st-century Italian businesspeople
21st-century Swiss businesswomen
21st-century Swiss businesspeople
A.C. Milan directors